Flipsyde is an American alternative hip hop group from Oakland, California.

Career
Flipsyde currently consists of lead vocalist and guitarist Steve Knight, lead guitarist Dave Lopez, and rapper The Piper (Jinho Ferreira). Their 2005 debut album, We the People, was released by Interscope Records and featured the singles "Happy Birthday" and "Someday", with the latter chosen as a theme song by NBC for the 2006 Winter Olympic Games, and appeared on the soundtrack for the 2008 film Never Back Down.

Flipsyde's 2008 follow-up album, State of Survival, featured production by Akon and a minor hit in "When It Was Good", but the record did not chart. The group was subsequently dropped by Interscope Records. Flipsyde released two EP's independently in 2011 and 2012. The group is currently working on a new project together.

Beyond Flipsyde 
Ferreira is a graduate of San Francisco State University and has written two unproduced screenplays, one of which won a screenwriting prize at the Tribeca Film Festival in April 2009.

Ferreira discussed his experiences growing up, becoming a rapper, and choosing to become a cop to try to address racial injustice in an episode of World Affairs, From Oakland to Johannesburg: Can We Reform the Police?, an episode of World Affairs.

Past members 

 DJ D-Sharp (Derrick Robinson), a founding member of Flipsyde, departed after the release of We the People.
 Chantelle Paige joined the group for the album State of Survival. After the album she moved on to pursue a solo career.

Discography

Studio albums

EPs

Mixtapes
The Pen and The Sword (2005)
Focus (2011)
Ignite (2012)
Gift (2012)
Transform (2012)

Singles

See also
List of former Interscope Records artists

Notes

References

External links

Flipsyde on MySpace

American hip hop groups
Rap rock groups
Interscope Records artists